Gobiosoma bosc (naked goby) is a fish named for its lack of scales. This is a true goby; it is part of the genus Gobiosoma.

Description 
The naked goby is usually less than 2 inches in length and lacks scales. The pelvic fins of the naked goby are linked together by a membrane, fitting the purpose of a sucker-like disk. The fin also reaches a point between the base and the anus. It ranges in color from a pale yellow to a murky brown, and is variably marked along its body.

Distribution and habitat 
Generally, naked gobies live in estuaries and coastal waters. It is noted that naked gobies may bury themselves in bottom sediments in the winter. The naked goby is found in the Western Atlantic from Connecticut to Mexico. It lives almost exclusively in habitats with brackish water. Younger members of the species are commonly found in estuaries south of New Jersey and only sporadically in estuaries north of New Jersey.

Reproduction 
They tend to reproduce from May to November. They are oviparous, meaning that they lay eggs.  The females are known to lay their eggs in empty oyster shells.  It is then up to the males to guard the eggs until they hatch.  After they hatch, the free swimming larvae may migrate upstream and school over oyster reefs before settling.

The lifespan of this fish is approximately 4 years.

Feeding 
With a terminal mouth and being bottom dwelling fish they are known to eat worms and small crustaceans.  However, it has been seen that they are attracted to injured or dead oysters.

Food energy content: 4.714 [kcal/g]

References

bosc
Fish described in 1800